Jimmy Tuivaiti (born 2 January 1988) is a New Zealand born, Italian rugby union player. His usual position is as a Flanker, and he currently plays for Valorugby Emilia.

Under contract with Calvisano, for 2017–18 Pro14 season, he named as Permit Player for Zebre in Pro 14. he played also for Zebre from 2018 to 2022.

From 2018 to 2020, Tuivaiti was named in the Italy squad.

References

External links
itsrugby.co.uk Profile

1988 births
Living people
Italian rugby union players
Italy international rugby union players
North Harbour rugby union players
Rugby Calvisano players
Zebre Parma players
Rugby union flankers
New Zealand expatriates in Italy
New Zealand sportspeople of Samoan descent
Rugby union players from Auckland